McDowell Township is one of twenty-five townships in Barry County, Missouri, United States. In the 1890s, the McDowell mines mined extracted lead and jack ore. As of the 2000 census, its population was 275.

Geography

The streams of Calton Creek, Gunter Creek, Little Flat Creek, Stansberry Creek and Willow Branch run through this township.

References

 USGS Geographic Names Information System (GNIS)

External links
 US-Counties.com
 City-Data.com

Townships in Barry County, Missouri
Townships in Missouri